The Friendship Radiosport Games (FRG) is an international multi-sport event that includes competitions in the various sports collectively referred to as radiosport.  The Friendship Radiosport Games began in 1989 as a result of a sister city agreement between Khabarovsk, Russia and Portland, Oregon, United States.  Since then, participation has been extended to other sister cities in the Pacific Rim.  The Friendship Radiosport Games are generally held in the month of August.

The most recent Friendship Radiosport Games were held on August 19–21, 2016, in Portland, Oregon.  Planning for the next games in Khabarovsk is starting with a target date of 2018.

History

The first Friendship Radiosport Games were held in 1989 in Khabarovsk, Russia, which was then still a part of the Soviet Union.  The games were organized as a result of the signing of a sister city agreement between the Far Eastern Russia city of Khabarovsk and the city of Portland, Oregon, on the west coast of the United States.  The origination of the idea for a friendly radiosport competition between the two cities can be credited to Yevgeny Stavitsky UAØCA, an active amateur radio operator in Khabarovsk.  Participants from Portland traveled to Khabarovsk to participate in the games, an event that would not have been possible only a few years before, as the two nations squared off against one another in the Cold War.  In 1991, the second Friendship Radiosport Games were held in Portland, hosted by the Friendship Amateur Radio Society, and participants from Khabarovsk traveled to Oregon to attend the event.  This would start a tradition of holding the event in August of every odd-numbered year.

Extending the event to additional sister cities, the host for the 1993 Friendship Radiosport Games was Victoria, British Columbia, Canada.  In addition to competitors from Canada, Russia, and the United States, competitors from the sister city of Niigata, Japan also came to the event in 1993.  The 1995 Friendship Radiosport Games were held in Khabarovsk, Russia for the second time, and representatives from all four cities were in attendance.  Tokyo, Japan became the fourth host city for the Friendship Radiosport Games when the event has held there in 1997.  The 1999 games returned to Portland, Oregon, United States, where the ARDF event was also designated the IARU Region II Championships, the first such  IARU sanctioned championships in the Americas.  The event returned to Victoria, British Columbia, Canada in 2001, where for the first time competitors from Melbourne, Victoria, Australia were also in attendance.  Breaking with the established pattern, the Friendship Radiosport Games were not held in 2003, but were instead held in 2004, again in Khabarovsk, Russia.  The invitation to participation was further extended to radio clubs in the Pacific Rim sister cities of Harbin, China, and Bucheon, Korea.

Event History and Location 

1989 - Khabarovsk, Russia
1991 - Portland, Oregon, U.S.A.
1993 - Victoria, British Columbia, Canada
1995 - Khabarovsk, Russia
1997 - Tokyo, Japan
1999 - Portland, Oregon, U.S.A.
2001 - Victoria, British Columbia, Canada
2004 - Khabarovsk, Russia
2008 - Portland, Oregon, U.S.A.
2011 - Khabarovsk, Russia
2016 - Portland, Oregon

Competition

The Friendship Radiosport Games have traditionally included events from all of the three activities collectively known as radiosport.  This includes HF contesting, Amateur Radio Direction Finding, and High Speed Telegraphy.  Some competitors participate in only one of these activities, while others have been competitive in multiple events.

Overall Team Competition Winner 

1989   Team Khabarovsk
1991   Team Portland
1993   Team Khabarovsk
1995   Team Khabarovsk
1997   Team Khabarovsk
1999   Team Portland
2001   Team Portland
2004   Team Khabarovsk
2008   Team Khabarovsk
2011   Team Khabarovsk
2016   Team Khabarovsk

See also
Amateur radio
Radiosport
Contesting
Amateur Radio Direction Finding
High Speed Telegraphy

References
Moell, Joe KØOV (1999).  "KØOV's Photo Album of the 1999 IARU ARDF Championships".  Retrieved Nov. 27, 2005.
Moell, Joe KØOV (2005).  "Radio-Orienteering Comes to the Americas".  Retrieved Nov. 27, 2005.
Stavitsky, Evgeny UAØCA (2004).  "Last Call For Friendship Radiosport Games".  Retrieved Nov 27, 2005.
Tyree, Larry N6TR (2015). "Picture gallery from FRG 2011".
Young, Joe VE7BFK (2001).  "Photos of FRG 2001".  Retrieved Dec. 4, 2005.
Stavitskiy, Eugene UA0CA (2016). "FRG information and photos".

Radiosport
Recurring sporting events established in 1989